The Graham-Hughes House is a Châteauesque residence in the Mount Vernon Place Historic District of Baltimore, Maryland. The house was designed by Baltimore architect George Archer and completed in 1888. It had been attributed to architect Charles E. Cassell and mistakenly thought to have been built in 1895 until discovery of an article in the March 12, 1888, edition of the Baltimore Sun crediting Archer as the architect and Baltimore jail warden John Waters as the builder.

The house is named for original owners George and Sarah Graham. Their daughter, Isabella, married Thomas Hughes and lived in the house until her death in 1977.

References

External links

 Architectural sights Tours: Architects pick Baltimore's most admired classic buildings
 BAF: George Archer

Houses in Baltimore
Houses completed in 1888
Mount Vernon, Baltimore
Châteauesque architecture in the United States
George Archer (architect)
Historic district contributing properties in Maryland
National Register of Historic Places in Baltimore
Houses on the National Register of Historic Places in Maryland